In mathematical physics, the Dirac equation in curved spacetime is a generalization of the Dirac equation from flat spacetime (Minkowski space) to curved spacetime, a general Lorentzian manifold.

Mathematical formulation

Spacetime 

Frame fields 

We use a set of vierbein or frame fields , which are a set of vector fields (which are not necessarily defined globally on ). Their defining equation is

The vierbein defines a local rest frame, allowing the constant Gamma matrices to act at each spacetime point. 

In differential-geometric language, the vierbein is equivalent to a section of the frame bundle, and so defines a local trivialization of the frame bundle.

Spin connection 

To write down the equation we also need the spin connection, also known as the connection (1-)form. The dual frame fields  have defining relation

The connection 1-form is then

where  is a covariant derivative, or equivalently a choice of connection on the frame bundle, most often taken to be the Levi-Civita connection.

One should be careful not to treat the abstract Latin indices and Greek indices as the same, and further to note that neither of these are coordinate indices: it can be verified that  doesn't transform as a tensor under a change of coordinates. 

Then abstract indices label the tangent space, while greek indices label . If the frame fields are position dependent then greek indices do not necessarily transform tensorially under a change of coordinates.

The connection form can be viewed as a more abstract connection on a principal bundle, specifically on the frame bundle, which is defined on any smooth manifold, but which restricts to an orthonormal frame bundle on pseudo-Riemannian manifolds.

The connection form with respect to frame fields  defined locally is, in differential-geometric language, the connection with respect to a local trivialization.

Clifford algebra 

Just as with the Dirac equation on flat spacetime, we make use of the Clifford algebra, a set of four gamma matrices  satisfying

where  is the anticommutator.

They can be used to construct a representation of the Lorentz algebra: defining
,
where  is the commutator. 

It can be shown they satisfy the commutation relations of the Lorentz algebra:

They therefore are the generators of a representation of the Lorentz algebra . But they do not generate a representation of the Lorentz group , just as the Pauli matrices generate a representation of the rotation algebra  but not . They in fact form a representation of  However, it is a standard abuse of terminology to any representations of the Lorentz algebra as representations of the Lorentz group, even if they do not arise as representations of the Lorentz group.

In the classification of Lorentz group representations, the representation is labelled .

The abuse of terminology extends to forming this representation at the group level.

where  is the standard basis for the Lorentz algebra. These generators have components

If another representation  has generators  then we write

where  are indices for the representation space. 

Covariant derivative for fields in a representation of the Lorentz group
Given a coordinate frame  arising from say coordinates , the partial derivative with respect to a general orthonormal frame  is defined

and connection components with respect to a general orthonormal frame are

These components do not transform tensorially under a change of frame, but do when combined. Also, these are definitions rather than saying that these objects can arise as partial derivatives in some coordinate chart. In general there are non-coordinate orthonormal frames, for which the commutator of vector fields is non-vanishing.

It can be checked that under the transformation 

if we define the covariant derivative
,
then  transforms as

This generalises to any representation  for the Lorentz group: if  is a vector field for the associated representation,

There are some subtleties in what kind of mathematical object the different types of covariant derivative are. The covariant derivative  in an orthonormal basis uses the orthonormal frame  to identify the vector-valued 1-form with a vector-valued dual vector which at each point  is an element of  using that  canonically.

Dirac equation on curved spacetime 

Recalling the Dirac equation on flat spacetime,

the Dirac equation on curved spacetime can be written down by promoting the partial derivative to a covariant one.

In this way, Dirac's equation takes the following form in curved spacetime:.

where  is a spinor field on spacetime. Mathematically, this is a section of a vector bundle associated to the spin-frame bundle by the representation

Recovering the Klein–Gordon equation from the Dirac equation 

The modified Klein–Gordon equation obtained by squaring the operator in the Dirac equation, first found by Erwin Schrödinger as cited by Pollock
 is given by 

An alternative version of the Dirac equation whose Dirac operator remains the square root of the Laplacian is given by the Dirac–Kähler equation; the price to pay is the loss of Lorentz invariance in curved spacetime.

Note that here Latin indices denote the "Lorentzian" vierbein labels while Greek indices denote manifold coordinate indices.

Action formulation 
We can formulate this theory in terms of an action. If in addition the spacetime  is orientable, there is a preferred orientation known as the volume form .
One can integrate functions against the volume form:

The function

is integrated against the volume form to obtain the Dirac action

See also

 Dirac equation in the algebra of physical space
 Dirac spinor
 Maxwell's equations in curved spacetime
 Two-body Dirac equations

References

Quantum field theory
Spinors
Partial differential equations
Fermions
Curved spacetime